"Voices" is a song by British electronic music duo Disclosure, featuring vocals from Sasha Keable. It was released as a digital download in the United Kingdom on 13 December 2013. The song is the sixth single from the duo's debut studio album, Settle (2013). The track peaked at number 176 on the UK Singles Chart and number 28 on the UK Dance Chart. It was written by Guy Lawrence, Howard Lawrence, Jimmy Napes, and Sasha Keable.

Music video
A music video to accompany the release of "Voices" was first released onto YouTube on 23 December 2013 at a total length of three minutes and forty-seven seconds.

Track listings

Chart performance

Weekly charts

Release history

References

Disclosure (band) songs
2013 singles
Songs written by Jimmy Napes
Songs written by Guy Lawrence
2013 songs
Island Records singles
Songs written by Howard Lawrence